The following is a list of Hungarian place names for towns and villages in the Prekmurje region of Slovenia. This region belonged to Kingdom of Hungary prior to the Treaty of Trianon.

List of Hungarian place names
Adrijanci, Andorháza, Adriáncz
Andrejci, Andorhegy
Bakovci, Barkóc
Banuta, Bánuta
Beltinci, Belatinc
Benica, Benice
Berkovci, Berkeháza
Beznovci, Buzahely
Bodonci, Bodóhegy, Bodoncz
Bogojina, Bagonya
Bokrači, Bokrács
Boreča, Borháza, Borecsa
Borejci, Borhida
Bratonci, Murabaráti
Brezovci, Vasnyíres
Brezovica, Lendvanyíres
Budinci, Bűdfalva, Büdincz
Bukovnica, Bakónak
Cankova, Vashidegkút
Celje, Cille
Čentiba, Csente
Čepinci, Kerkafő, Csöpincz
Černelavci, Kisszombat
Čikečka vas, Csekefa
Črenšovci, Cserföld, Cserensócz
Dankovci, Őrfalu, Dankóc
Dobrovnik, Dobronak
Dokležovje, Murahely
Dolenci, Nagydolány, Dolincz
Dolga Vas, Hosszúfalu
Dolgovaške Gorice, Hosszúfaluhegy
Dolič, Völgyköz, Dolics
Dolina, Völgyes
Dolina pri Lendavi, Völgyifalu
Dolnja Bistrica, Alsóbeszterce
Dolnji Lakoš, Alsólakos
Dolnji Slaveči, Alsócsalogány, Alsószlavecsa
Domajinci, Dombalja
Domanjševci, Domonkosfa
Filovci, Filóc
Fikšinci, Kismáriahavas, Füksincz
Fokovci, Úrdomb
Gaberje, Gyertyános, Zalagyertyános
Gančani, Lendvarózsavölgy, Gancsán
Gederovci, Kőhida, Gederócz
Genterovci, Göntérháza
Gerlinci, Görhegy, Görlincz
Gibina, Murafüred
Gomilica, Lendvaszentjózsef
Gorica, Halmosfő
Gornja Bistrica, Felsőbeszterce
Gornji Črnci, Királyszék, Felsőcsernecz
Gornji Lakoš, Felsőlakos
Gornji Petrovci, Péterhegy, Felsőpetrócz
Gornji Slaveči, Felsőcsalogány, Felsőszlavecsa
Grad, Felsőlendva
Gradišče, Muravárhely
Hodoš, Őrihodos
Hotiza, Murarév, Hotiza
Ivanci, Zalaivánd, Iváncz
Ivanjševci, Jánosfa
Ivanovci, Alsószentbenedek, Ivanócz
Ižakovci, Murasziget
Kamovci, Kámaháza
Kančevci, Felsőszentbenedek, Kancsócz
Kapca, Kapca
Kobilje, Kebeleszentmárton
Korovci, Károlyfa
Košarovci, Kosárháza
Kot, Kót
Kovačevci, Vaskovácsi
Krajna, Véghely
Kramarovci, Határfalva
Krašči, Lendvakirályfa
Križevci, Tótkeresztúr
Krnci, Lendvakislak
Krog, Korong
Krplivnik, Kapornak
Kruplivnik, Vaskorpád
Kukeč, Újkökényes
Kupšinci, Murahalmos
Kuštanovci, Gesztenyés
Kuzma, Kuzma
Lemerje, Lehomér
Lendava, Alsólendva
Lendavske Gorice, Lendvahegy
Lipa, Kislippa
Lipovci, Hársliget
Lončarovci, Gerőháza, Gerencserócz
Lucova, Lakháza
Lukačevci, Lukácsfa
Mačkovci, Mátyásdomb, Macskócz
Mala Polana, Kispalina
Mali Dolenci, Kisdolány, Kisdolincz
Markišavci, Márkusháza
Markovci, Marokrét, Markócz
Martinje, Magasfok, Martinya
Martjanci, Mártonhely, Martyáncz
Matjaševci, Szentmátyás, Matyasócz
Melinci, Muramelence
Mladetinci, Málnás, Mladetincz
Mlajtinci, Kismálnás
Moravske Toplice, Alsómarác
Moščanci, Musznya
Mostje, Lendava, Hídvég
Motovilci, Mottolyád
Motvarjevci, Szentlászló, Szécsiszentlászló
Murska Sobota, Muraszombat
Murski Črnci, Muracsermely, Muracsernec
Murski Petrovci, Murapetróc
Nedelica, Zorkóháza
Nemčavci, Lendvanemesd
Neradnovci, Nádorfa, Neradnócz
Noršinci, Újtölgyes, Norsincz
Novi Beznovci, Borostyán
Nuskova, Dióslak
Ocinje, Gedőudvar
Odranci, Adorjánfalva
Otovci, Ottóháza
Panovci, Úriszék
Pečarovci, Szentsebestyén
Pertoča, Perestó, Pertocsa
Peskovci, Petőfa
Petanjci, Szécsénykút, Petáncz
Petišovci, Petesháza
Pince, Pince
Pince-Marof, Pincemajor
Polana, Vaspolony
Pordašinci, Kisfalu
Poznanovci, Pálhegy
Predanovci, Rónafő
Prosečka vas, Kölesvölgy
Prosenjakovci, Pártosfalva
Puconci, Battyánd, Pucincz
Puževci, Pálmafa
Radmožanci, Radamos
Radovci, Radófa
Rakičan, Battyánfalva, Rakicsán
Rankovci, Ferenclak
Ratkovci, Rátkalak
Razkrižje, Ráckanizsa
Renkovci, Lendvaerdő
Rogašovci, Szarvaslak, Rogasócz
Ropoča, Rétállás, Ropocsa
Šafarsko, Ligetfalva
Šalamenci, Salamon, Salamoncz
Šalovci, Sal
Satahovci, Muraszentes
Sebeborci, Szentbibor
Selo, Nagytótlak
Serdica, Seregháza
Skakovci, Szécsényfa
Sodišinci, Bírószék, Szodesincz
Sotina, Hegyszoros, Szotina
Središče, Moravske Toplice, Szerdahely
Srednja Bistrica, Középbeszterce
Stanjevci, Kerkaszabadhegy
Strehovci, Őrszentvid, Sztrelecz
Strukovci, Sűrűház, Strukócz
Suhi Vrh, Szárazhegy
Šulinci, Sándorvölgy, Sülincz
Sveti Jurij, Vízlendva, Szentgyörgy
Tešanovci, Mezővár
Tišina, Csendlak, Tissina
Topolovci, Jegenyés
Trdkova, Türke
Trimlini, Hármasmalom
Trnje, Tüskeszer
Tropovci, Murafüzes
Turnišče, Bántornya, Turniscsa
Vadarci, Tiborfa, Tivadarcz
Vanča vas, Ivánfalva
Vaneča, Vaslak, Vanecsa
Večeslavci, Vasvecsés
Velika Polana, Nagypalina
Veščica, Végfalva
Veščica pri Murski Soboti, Falud
Vidonci, Vidorlak, Vidoncz
Vučja Gomila, Zsidahegy
Ženavlje, Gyanafa
Zenkovci, Zoltánháza
Žitkovci, Zsitkóc
Žižki, Zsizsekszer

See also 
 Hungarian exonyms

Prekmurje
Slovenia-related lists
Hungarian exonyms in Prekmurje
Hungarian